The PSA World Series 2017–18 is a series of men's and women's squash tournaments which are part of the Professional Squash Association (PSA) World Tour for the end of 2017 and the start of 2018. The PSA World Series tournaments are some of the most prestigious events on the men's and women's tour. The best-performing players in the World Series events qualify for the annual 2018 Men's PSA World Series Finals and 2018 Women's PSA World Series Finals tournament.

PSA World Series Ranking Points
PSA World Series events also have a separate World Series ranking.  Points for this are calculated on a cumulative basis after each World Series event. The top eight players at the end of the calendar year are then eligible to play in the PSA World Series Finals.

Men's

Tournaments

Standings

{| class="wikitable"
|-
|colspan=13 align="center"|Top 16 Men's World Series Standings 2017–18
|-
|- style="font-size:10pt;font-weight:bold"
! rowspan=2 align="center"|Rank
! rowspan=2 align="center"|Player
! rowspan=2 align="center"|Number ofTournament
! US Open
! QatarClassic
! Hong KongOpen
! Tournamentof Champions
! Windy CityOpen
! El GounaInternational
! BritishOpen
! rowspan=2 align="center"|TotalPoints
|-
|align="center"|USA 
|align="center"|QAT 
|align="center"|HKG 
|align="center"|USA 
|align="center"|USA 
|align="center"|EGY 
|align="center"|ENG 
|-
|align=center|1
| Mohamed El Shorbagy
|align=center|7
|align=center style="background:#D8BFD8;"|65
|align=center style="background:#00ff00"|100
|align=center style="background:#00ff00"|100
|align=center|15
|align=center style="background:#00ff00"|100
|align=center style="background:yellow;"|40
|align=center style="background:#D8BFD8;"|65
|align=right|485
|-
|align=center|2
| Ali Farag
|align=center|7
|align=center style="background:#00ff00"|100
|align=center style="background:#ffebcd;"|25
|align=center style="background:#D8BFD8;"|65
|align=center style="background:yellow;"|40
|align=center style="background:yellow;"|40
|align=center style="background:#D8BFD8;"|65
|align=center style="background:#ffebcd;"|25
|align=right|360
|-
|align=center|3
| Marwan El Shorbagy‡
|align=center|7
|align=center|15
|align=center style="background:#ffebcd;"|25
|align=center style="background:yellow;"|40
|align=center|15
|align=center style="background:#D8BFD8;"|65
|align=center style="background:#00ff00"|100
|align=center style="background:#ffebcd;"|25
|align=right|285
|-
|align=center|4
| Simon Rösner
|align=center|7
|align=center style="background:#ffebcd;"|25
|align=center style="background:yellow;"|40
|align=center|15
|align=center style="background:#00ff00"|100
|align=center style="background:#ffebcd;"|25
|align=center style="background:#ffebcd;"|25
|align=center style="background:#ffebcd;"|25
|align=right|255
|-
|align=center|5
| Tarek Momen
|align=center|7
|align=center|15
|align=center style="background:#D8BFD8;"|65
|align=center style="background:#ffebcd;"|25
|align=center style="background:#D8BFD8;"|65
|align=center style="background:yellow;"|40
|align=center style="background:#ffebcd;"|25
|align=center|10
|align=right|245
|-
|align=center rowspan=2|6
| Grégory Gaultier
|align=center|5
|align=center|–
|align=center style="background:yellow;"|40
|align=center style="background:#ffebcd;"|25
|align=center style="background:yellow;"|40
|align=center|–
|align=center style="background:yellow;"|40
|align=center style="background:yellow;"|40
|align=right|185
|-
| Miguel Ángel Rodríguez
|align=center|6
|align=center|10
|align=center|10
|align=center|–
|align=center|15
|align=center style="background:#ffebcd;"|25
|align=center style="background:#ffebcd;"|25
|align=center style="background:#00ff00"|100
|align=right|185
|-
|align=center|8
| Karim Abdel Gawad
|align=center|7
|align=center|10
|align=center|15
|align=center style="background:yellow;"|40
|align=center|15
|align=center style="background:#ffebcd;"|25
|align=center style="background:#ffebcd;"|25
|align=center|15
|align=right|145
|-
|align=center|9
| Nick Matthew
|align=center|5
|align=center style="background:yellow;"|40
|align=center style="background:#ffebcd;"|25
|align=center|–
|align=center style="background:#ffebcd;"|25
|align=center|15
|align=center|–
|align=center|15
|align=right|120
|-
|align=center|10
| Omar Mosaad
|align=center|7
|align=center style="background:yellow;"|40
|align=center|15
|align=center|10
|align=center|10
|align=center|10
|align=center|15
|align=center|15
|align=right|115
|-
|align=center|11
| Diego Elías
|align=center|6
|align=center style="background:#ffebcd;"|25
|align=center style="background:#ffebcd;"|25
|align=center|–
|align=center|15
|align=center|15
|align=center|10
|align=center|10
|align=right|100
|-
|align=center|12
| Mohamed Abouelghar
|align=center|7
|align=center|15
|align=center|10
|align=center style="background:#ffebcd;"|25
|align=center|10
|align=center|10
|align=center|10
|align=center|15
|align=right|95
|-
|align=center|13
| Paul Coll
|align=center|6
|align=center|15
|align=center|10
|align=center|15
|align=center|15
|align=center|10
|align=center|–
|align=center style="background:#ffebcd;"|25
|align=right|90
|-
|align=center rowspan=4|14
| Ryan Cuskelly
|align=center|6
|align=center|10
|align=center|10
|align=center|15
|align=center style="background:#ffebcd;"|25
|align=center|15
|align=center|–
|align=center|10
|align=right|85
|-
| Raphael Kandra
|align=center|7
|align=center|10
|align=center|10
|align=center|10
|align=center|0
|align=center|0
|align=center|15
|align=center style="background:yellow;"|40
|align=right|85
|-
| Cameron Pilley
|align=center|6
|align=center|10
|align=center|15
|align=center|15
|align=center|10
|align=center style="background:#ffebcd;"|25
|align=center|–
|align=center|10
|align=right|85
|-
| César Salazar
|align=center|7
|align=center|15
|align=center|10
|align=center|10
|align=center|10
|align=center|10
|align=center|15
|align=center|15
|align=right|85
|}
‡Marwan El Shorbagy withdraws to the World Series Finals on 30 May due to a hamstring injury. 

Bold – Players qualified for the final

Women's

Tournaments

Standings

{| class="wikitable"
|-
|colspan=13 align="center"|Top 16 Women's World Series Standings 2017–18
|-
|- style="font-size:10pt;font-weight:bold"
! rowspan=2 align="center"|Rank
! rowspan=2 align="center"|Player
! rowspan=2 align="center"|Number ofTournament
! US Open
! Hong KongOpen
! Saudi Masters
! Tournamentof Champions
! Windy CityOpen
! El GounaInternational
! BritishOpen
! rowspan=2 align="center"|TotalPoints
|-
|align="center"|USA 
|align="center"|HKG 
|align="center"|SAU 
|align="center"|USA 
|align="center"|USA 
|align="center"|EGY 
|align="center"|ENG 
|-
|align=center|1
| Nour El Sherbini
|align=center|7
|align=center style="background:#ffebcd;"|25
|align=center style="background:#00ff00"|100
|align=center style="background:#00ff00"|100
|align=center style="background:#00ff00"|100
|align=center style="background:#ffebcd;"|25
|align=center style="background:#D8BFD8;"|65
|align=center style="background:#00ff00"|100
|align=right|515
|-
|align=center|2
| Raneem El Weleily
|align=center|7
|align=center style="background:#D8BFD8;"|65
|align=center style="background:#D8BFD8;"|65
|align=center style="background:#D8BFD8;"|65
|align=center style="background:#ffebcd;"|25
|align=center style="background:yellow;"|40
|align=center style="background:#00ff00"|100
|align=center style="background:#D8BFD8;"|65
|align=right|425
|-
|align=center|3
| Nour El Tayeb
|align=center|7
|align=center style="background:#00ff00"|100
|align=center|15
|align=center style="background:yellow;"|40
|align=center style="background:#D8BFD8;"|65
|align=center style="background:#00ff00"|100
|align=center style="background:yellow;"|40
|align=center style="background:#ffebcd;"|25
|align=right|385
|-
|align=center|4
| Laura Massaro
|align=center|6
|align=center style="background:yellow;"|40
|align=center style="background:yellow;"|40
|align=center|–
|align=center style="background:yellow;"|40
|align=center|15
|align=center style="background:yellow;"|40
|align=center style="background:yellow;"|40
|align=right|215
|-
|align=center rowspan=2|5
| Joelle King
|align=center|7
|align=center style="background:yellow;"|40
|align=center style="background:#ffebcd;"|25
|align=center style="background:#ffebcd;"|25
|align=center|15
|align=center style="background:#D8BFD8;"|65
|align=center|15
|align=center|15
|align=right|200
|-
| Camille Serme
|align=center|7
|align=center|15
|align=center style="background:yellow;"|40
|align=center|15
|align=center style="background:yellow;"|40
|align=center style="background:#ffebcd;"|25
|align=center style="background:#ffebcd;"|25
|align=center style="background:yellow;"|40
|align=right|200
|-
|align=center|7
| Nouran Gohar
|align=center|7
|align=center style="background:#ffebcd;"|25
|align=center style="background:#ffebcd;"|25
|align=center style="background:yellow;"|40
|align=center style="background:#ffebcd;"|25
|align=center|15
|align=center|15
|align=center|15
|align=right|160
|-
|align=center|8
| Sarah-Jane Perry
|align=center|7
|align=center|10
|align=center|15
|align=center style="background:#ffebcd;"|25
|align=center style="background:#ffebcd;"|25
|align=center style="background:yellow;"|40
|align=center|15
|align=center style="background:#ffebcd;"|25
|align=right|155
|-
|align=center|9
| Alison Waters
|align=center|7
|align=center style="background:#ffebcd;"|25
|align=center|15
|align=center|15
|align=center|15
|align=center style="background:#ffebcd;"|25
|align=center style="background:#ffebcd;"|25
|align=center style="background:#ffebcd;"|25
|align=right|145
|-
|align=center rowspan=2|10
| Annie Au
|align=center|7
|align=center style="background:#ffebcd;"|25
|align=center|15
|align=center|15
|align=center|10
|align=center|15
|align=center style="background:#ffebcd;"|25
|align=center|15
|align=right|120
|-
| Tesni Evans
|align=center|7
|align=center|15
|align=center style="background:#ffebcd;"|25
|align=center|15
|align=center|15
|align=center|15
|align=center|10
|align=center style="background:#ffebcd;"|25
|align=right|120
|-
|align=center|12
| Nicol David
|align=center|6
|align=center|15
|align=center style="background:#ffebcd;"|25
|align=center style="background:#ffebcd;"|25
|align=center style="background:#ffebcd;"|25
|align=center|10
|align=center|15
|align=center|–
|align=right|115
|-
|align=center|13
| Joshna Chinappa
|align=center|7
|align=center|15
|align=center|15
|align=center|15
|align=center|10
|align=center|10
|align=center style="background:#ffebcd;"|25
|align=center|10
|align=right|100
|-
|align=center rowspan=2|14
| Olivia Blatchford
|align=center|7
|align=center|15
|align=center|15
|align=center|15
|align=center|15
|align=center|15
|align=center|10
|align=center|10
|align=right|95
|-
| Victoria Lust
|align=center|7
|align=center|15
|align=center|10
|align=center|15
|align=center|15
|align=center|10
|align=center|15
|align=center|15
|align=right|95
|-
|align=center|16
| Hania El Hammamy
|align=center|7
|align=center|10
|align=center|10
|align=center|15
|align=center|10
|align=center|15
|align=center|15
|align=center|10
|align=right|85
|}
Bold – Players qualified for the final

See also
2017 PSA World Tour
2018 PSA World Tour
Official Men's Squash World Ranking
Official Women's Squash World Ranking

References

External links 
 World Series Series Squash website

PSA World Tour seasons
2017 in squash
2018 in squash